Sunil Kumar Singh (born 10 January 1962) is an Indian politician and a member of parliament from Chatra Parliamentary Constituency, Jharkhand. He won the 2014 Indian general election being a Bharatiya Janata Party candidate.  He again won from the same Chatra in the 2019 Lok Sabha elections.

Early life and family
Sunil Kumar Singh born on 10 January 1962 in Bihar to Kedar Nath Singh and Nirmala Devi. He married Mrs. Paratima Singh.

Career
Positions Held
May, 2014	Elected to 16th Lok Sabha member of parliament from Chatra (Lok Sabha constituency), Jharkhand as Bharatiya Janata Party 
Whip BJP, Won the Seat ensuring all candidates against him lost their deposits.  
Member, Committee on Government Assurances,
Member, Standing Committee on Coal and Steel,
Member, Consultative Committee, Ministry of External Affairs and Overseas Indian Affairs,
Member, Joint Committee on Bill to Amend the Citizenship Act, 1955
Member, Consultative Committee, Ministry of Skill Development and Entrepreneurship
2017-2019 President, India-Republic of Korea Parliamentary Friendship Group
May, 2019 Re-elected to 17th Lok Sabha (2nd term) member of parliament from Chatra (Lok Sabha constituency), Jharkhand as Bharatiya Janata Party.
Lok Sabha Won the Seat for a second time in a row by ensuring all candidates against him lost their deposits.  
Whip, Bharatiya Janata Party,
Member, Business Advisory Committee in Lok Sabha
Member, Standing Committee on Coal and Steel
09 Oct. 2019 onwards	Chairperson, Committee of Privileges in Lok Sabha

Special Interests
Indian Culture and Traditions; Working through voluntary organisations to make Damodar, Subarnrekha and other rivers in Jharkhand pollution free
  
Countries Visited
Mauritius and U.S.A.
Visited Mauritius as a Representative of India to participate in the deliberations of the Council for International Cooperation in 1995; Attended International Visitor Leadership Programme (IVLP) in 2007 on the invitation of Government of USA

Germany, Climate Parliament, 2017; Cyprus, Bulgaria, Czech Republic with Hon`able President of India, 2 Sept. - 9 Sept. 2018

References

India MPs 2014–2019
Living people
People from Chatra district
Lok Sabha members from Jharkhand
Bharatiya Janata Party politicians from Jharkhand
1962 births
India MPs 2019–present